The Quebec Expedition, or the Walker Expedition to Quebec, was a British attempt to attack Quebec in 1711 in Queen Anne's War, the North American theatre of the War of Spanish Succession.  It failed when seven transports and one storeship were wrecked and some 850 soldiers drowned in one of the worst naval disasters in British history.

The expedition was planned by the administration of Robert Harley, chief minister of the crown, and was based on plans originally proposed in 1708.  Harley decided to mount the expedition as part of a major shift in British military policy, emphasizing strength at sea.  The expedition's leaders, Admiral Hovenden Walker and Brigadier-General John Hill, were chosen for their politics and connections to the crown, and its plans were kept secret even from the Admiralty. French agents were able to discover British intentions and warn authorities in Quebec.

The expedition expected to be fully provisioned in Boston, the capital of colonial Massachusetts, but the city was unprepared when it arrived, and Massachusetts authorities had to scramble to provide even three months' supplies.  Admiral Walker also had difficulty acquiring experienced pilots and accurate charts for navigating the waters of the lower Saint Lawrence River.  The expedition reached the Gulf of Saint Lawrence without incident, but foggy conditions, tricky currents, and strong winds combined to drive the fleet toward the north shore of the river near a place now called Pointe-aux-Anglais, where the ships were wrecked.  Following the disaster, Walker abandoned the expedition's objectives and returned to England.  Although the expedition was a failure, Harley continued to implement his "blue water" policy.

Background

In 1710, late in the War of Spanish Succession, a mixed force of British regulars and American colonists captured the French fort at Port Royal on the northwestern coast of Acadia (present-day Annapolis Royal, Nova Scotia). Francis Nicholson, the leader of the expedition, brought news of the victory to London, where he and Jeremiah Dummer, who represented the Province of Massachusetts Bay in London, lobbied for an expedition against Quebec, the capital of New France.

The British government was in some turmoil, and in August 1710, the ministry of Lord Godolphin fell.  Queen Anne replaced him with Robert Harley, a political opponent of the Duke of Marlborough, who had also fallen out of favour. Harley wanted to change Britain's military strategy, implementing a "blue water" policy that emphasized strength at sea, at the cost of a reduced army. He also sought to blunt Marlborough's continuing influence with a victory of his own devising.  Harley therefore authorised expeditions by land and sea to capture Quebec, but fell ill, so most of the work of organisation was done by his Secretary of State, Henry St. John (the future Lord Bolingbroke).

The basic plan followed one first proposed by Samuel Vetch in 1708 for the 1709 campaign season, with the main thrust to be a naval expedition carrying a combined force of regular army forces and provincial troops.  Rear Admiral of the White Sir Hovenden Walker was given overall command of the expedition, with Brigadier John Hill in command of the land forces. Walker, who was promoted to admiral in March, had led a squadron on an expedition to the West Indies earlier in the war that had failed to produce significant results, and may have been chosen due to his friendship with St. John and his Tory sympathies. St. John probably chose Hill to curry favour at court: he was the brother of Queen Anne's confidante Abigail Masham.  The duchess of Marlborough, presumably echoing the opinions of her husband, wrote of Hill that "he was no good as a soldier". Five regiments from Marlborough's force in Flanders were added to two from Britain to build a force of some 5,000 land troops. This force sailed from ports in southern England in April and May 1711. Its destination was a tightly guarded secret: Walker was not immediately informed of its destination, nor were the Lords of the Admiralty informed, and it was provisioned only with sufficient supplies for a typical voyage in European waters in an attempt to mislead spies.

Boston
Francis Nicholson arrived in Boston in early June 1711 with news and details of the expedition plans, and a meeting of provincial governors was quickly arranged in New London, Connecticut. The naval expedition was to include provincial militia raised in the New England colonies, while Nicholson led a provincial force raised in provinces from Connecticut to Pennsylvania up the Hudson River and down Lake Champlain to Montreal. The provincial forces that were to go with Walker's expedition were led by Samuel Vetch, who became the governor of Nova Scotia in 1710.  They consisted of 1,500 men, most from Massachusetts, with smaller contingents from New Hampshire and Rhode Island.

The fleet arrived in Boston on 24 June, and the troops were disembarked onto Noddle's Island (the present-day location of Logan International Airport).  The size of the force was, according to historian Samuel Adams Drake, "the most formidable that had ever crossed the Atlantic under the English flag." Since the fleet had left with insufficient supplies, its organizers expected it to be fully provisioned in Boston.  But as the number of soldiers and sailors outnumbered the population of Boston, this proved a daunting task. Laws were passed to prevent merchants from price-gouging, and sufficient provisions were eventually acquired. Additional laws were passed penalizing residents found harbouring deserters from the fleet; apparently the attraction of colonial life was sufficient that this was a significant problem during the five weeks the expedition was in Boston.

During the expedition's sojourn in Boston, Walker attempted to enlist pilots experienced in navigating the Saint Lawrence River.  To his dismay, none were forthcoming; even Captain Cyprian Southack, reputed to be one of the colony's best navigators, claimed he had never been beyond the river's mouth. Walker intended to rely principally on a Frenchman he had picked up in Plymouth prior to the fleet's departure.  Samuel Vetch, however, deeply distrusted the Frenchman, writing that he was "not only an ignorant, pretending, idle, drunken Fellow", but that he "is come upon no good Design". Following this report, Walker also forced a Captain Jean Paradis, the captain of a captured French sloop, to serve as navigator. The charts Walker accumulated were notably short in details on the area around the mouth of the Saint Lawrence, as was the journal Sir William Phips kept of his 1690 expedition to Quebec, which Walker also acquired.  Walker interviewed some participants in the Phips expedition, whose vague tales did nothing to relieve his concerns about what he could expect on the river. These concerns prompted him to detach his largest and heaviest ships for cruising duty, and he transferred his flag to the 70-gun Edgar.

Disaster

On 30 July, the fleet set sail from Boston.  It consisted of a mix of British and colonial ships, including nine ships of war, two bomb vessels, and 60 transports and tenders.  It carried 7,500 troops and about 6,000 sailors. By 3 August the fleet reached the coast of Nova Scotia, and Samuel Vetch piloted the fleet around Cape Breton and Cape North on Cape Breton Island, and into the Gulf of Saint Lawrence.

On the morning of 18 August, just as the expedition was about to enter the Saint Lawrence River, the wind began to blow hard from the northwest, and Walker was forced to seek shelter in Gaspé Bay. On the morning of the 20th, the wind veered to the southeast, and he was able to advance slowly past the western extremity of Anticosti Island before it died down and thick fog blanketed both shore and fleet. By the 22nd, the wind had freshened from the southeast, and there were intermittent breaks in the fog, but not sufficient to give sight of land. This area, near what is now called Pointe-aux-Anglais, includes a number of small islands, including Île-aux-Oeufs (Egg Island), and numerous rocky shallows. After consulting his pilots, Walker gave the signal to head the fleet roughly southwest at about 8:00 pm.

Walker had thought he was in mid-stream when he issued the order. In fact, he was about seven leagues (about ) north of his proper course, and in the grasp of strong currents which steered his ships towards the northwest.  Propelled by an easterly wind, the fleet was gradually closing on the north–south shore near Île-aux-Oeufs. When Captain Paddon reported to Walker that land had been sighted around 10:30 pm, presumably dead ahead, Walker assumed that the fleet was approaching the south shore, and ordered the fleet to wear, and bring-to on the other tack, before he went to bed.  This manoeuvre put the fleet onto a more northerly heading. Some minutes later, an army captain named Goddard roused Walker, claiming to see breakers ahead. Walker dismissed the advice and the man, but Goddard returned, insisting that the admiral "come upon deck myself, or we should certainly be lost".

Walker came on deck in his dressing gown, and saw that the ship was being driven toward the western lee shore by the east wind.  When the French navigator came on deck, he explained to Walker where he was; Walker immediately ordered the anchor cables cut, and beat against the wind to escape the danger. Two of the warships, Montague and Windsor, had more difficulty, and ended up anchored for the night in a precarious situation, surrounded by breakers.  Throughout the night, Walker heard sounds of distress, and at times when the fog lifted, ships could be seen in the distance being ground against the rocks. One New Englander wrote that he could "hear the shrieks of the sinking, drowning, departing souls." Around 2:00 am the wind subsided, and then shifted to the northwest, and most of the fleet managed to stand away from the shore.

It took three days to discover the full extent of the disaster, during which the fleet searched for survivors. Seven transports and one supply ship were lost. Walker's initial report was that 884 soldiers perished; later reports revised this number down to 740, including women attached to some of the units. Historian Gerald Graham estimates that about 150 sailors also perished in the disaster. After rescuing all he could, Walker and Hill held a war council on 25 August.  After interviewing a number of the pilots, including Samuel Vetch, the council decided "that by reason of the Ignorance of the Pilots abord the Men of War", the expedition should be aborted. Vetch openly blamed Walker for the disaster: "The late disaster cannot, in my humble opinion, be anyways imputed to the difficulty of navigation, but to the wrong course we steered, which most unavoidably carried us upon the north shore."

The fleet sailed down the Gulf of Saint Lawrence and came to anchor at Spanish River (now the harbour of Sydney, Nova Scotia) on 4 September, where a council was held to discuss whether or not to attack the French at Plaisance.  Given the lateness of the season, insufficient supplies to overwinter in the area, and rumours of strong defences at Plaisance, the council decided against making the attack, and sailed for England.

Return
Francis Nicholson's land expedition learned of the naval disaster when it was encamped near Lake George; Nicholson aborted the expedition.  He was reported to be so angry that he tore off his wig and threw it to the ground.

The expedition's fortunes did not improve on the return voyage.  Walker had written to New York requesting  and any available supply ships to join him; unbeknownst to him, the Feversham and three transports (Joseph, Mary, and Neptune) were wrecked on the coast of Cape Breton on 7 October with more than 100 men lost. The fleet returned to Portsmouth on 10 October; Walker's flagship, the Edgar, blew up several days later, possibly due to improper handling of gunpowder. Walker lost a number of papers as a result, and claimed that the journal of William Phips was lost in the blast.

Despite the magnitude of the expedition's failure, the political consequences were relatively mild.  The failure was an early setback in Robert Harley's "blue water" policy, which called for the aggressive use of the navy to keep England's enemies at bay.  Harley nevertheless continued to implement the policy, withdrawing further resources from European military campaigns. Since the project had been organised by the current government, it was also not interested in delving deeply into the reasons for its failure.  Walker was sympathetically received by the queen, and both he and Hill were given new commands. Walker eventually wrote a detailed and frank account of the expedition, based on his memory as well as surviving journals and papers; it is reprinted in Graham.  Walker was stripped of his rank in 1715 (amid a larger change of power including the accession of King George I), and died in 1728.

Popular sentiment in England tended to fault the colonies for failing to properly support the expedition, citing parsimony and stubbornness as reasons. These sentiments were rejected in the colonies, where Nicholson and Governor Dudley instead blamed Walker. The relations between the military leadership and the colonial populations was not always cordial during the army's stay outside Boston, and foreshadowed difficult relations between civilians and military occupiers in the political conflicts that preceded the American Revolutionary War.  One of Hill's officers wrote of the "ill Nature and Sowerness of these People, whose Government, Doctrine, and Manners, whose Hypocracy and canting, are unsupportable", and further commented that unless they were brought under firmer control, the colonists would "grow more stiff and disobedient every Day." Colonists noted with some disgust the fact that both Walker and Hill escaped censure for the expedition's failure.

French actions
Authorities in France were alerted as early as March 1711 that Nicholson was organising an expedition against Quebec. They also knew the composition of Hill's force, but were apparently unaware of his destination until July. The Governor-general of New France, the marquis de Vaudreuil, sent Louis Denys de La Ronde to Boston ostensibly to oversee a prisoner exchange in early June.  La Ronde also had secret instructions that he was to try to convince the colonial authorities to withhold support from expeditions sent from England.  La Ronde, who coincidentally arrived in Boston on 8 June, the same day as Nicholson, was apparently unsuccessful in his attempts to influence colonial opinion.  Nicholson became suspicious of his behaviour and eventually had him arrested.  When copies of his secret instructions were found aboard a captured French vessel and brought to Boston, La Ronde was held in Boston until November.

Governor Vaudreuil was warned again in August that expeditions against Quebec and Montreal were being organised.  He called out his militia, rallied local Indians, and prepared his defences as best he could, putting the whole colony on a war footing. In mid-October word reached Quebec that large ships were approaching, heightening tensions further.  It turned out they were French, and on board was a scout Vaudreuil had sent downriver on 19 September to watch for the British fleet.  The scout reported finding the wreckage of seven ships and an estimated 1,500 bodies. Although locals were already plundering through the wreckage, the colony organised a formal salvage operation that recovered items like anchors, chains, tents, and cannons; the items recovered were auctioned.

Land forces
 Queen's Royal Sea Service Foot (4th) 
 Stanhope's Sea Service Foot (11th) 
Livesays' Sea Service Foot (12th) 
 Handasyde's Sea Service Foot (22nd) 
 Wetham's Sea Service Foot (27th) (Irish Establishment) 
 Saunderson's 1st Marines (30th) 
 Donegal's Marines (35th) (Irish Establishment) 
Charlemont's Sea Service Foot (36th) (Irish Establishment) 
 Meredeth's Sea Service Foot (37th) (Irish Establishment) 
 One company each from:
Villier's 2nd Marines (31st) (Irish Establishment) 
 Borr's 3rd Marines (32nd) 
Mordaunts' Marines
 Holt's Marines
 Shannon's Marines
 Vetch's Regiment, Colonel Samuel Vetch (Massachusetts)
 Walton's Regiment, Colonel Shadrach Walton (New Hampshire-Rhode Island)

Source:

Fleet

Warships

Other ships
The fleet is listed in the order of sail drawn up by Admiral Walker.  Ships generally sailed two abreast.

Notes

References

External links
Description of Nicholson's expedition

Naval battles of the War of the Spanish Succession
Quebec 1711
Quebec 1711
Quebec Expedition
Disasters in Quebec
1711 in France
1711 in Canada
New France
Military expeditions
Expeditions from Great Britain
Queen Anne's War
18th century in Quebec
Shipwrecks of the Saint Lawrence River